Zephirin Toups Sr. House is a historic house located along Bayou Blue Bypass Road, about  southeast of Thibodaux, Louisiana.

Built in 1866, the house is a -story frame residence in French Creole style with some Greek Revival decorative details. The house was originally located along Bayou Lafourche, on LA 308, between Thibodaux and Raceland. The house was threatened with demolition in 1974, was purchased by a descendant of Zephirin Toups and moved to its present location.

The house was added to the National Register of Historic Places on August 12, 1993.

See also
 National Register of Historic Places listings in Lafourche Parish, Louisiana

References

Houses on the National Register of Historic Places in Louisiana
Houses completed in 1866
Houses completed in the 19th century
Houses in Lafourche Parish, Louisiana
National Register of Historic Places in Lafourche Parish, Louisiana